Yeni Aktüel ("New News" in Turkish; increasingly downplays the "Yeni" and may be referred to simply as Aktüel) is a Turkish weekly news magazine.

History and profile
The magazine was established in 1991 by Ercan Arıklı. The first issue came out on 11 July 1991. Its first editor (1991 - 1995) was Alper Görmüş.

References

External links
 Official website

1991 establishments in Turkey
Magazines established in 1991
Magazines published in Istanbul
Turkish-language magazines
Weekly news magazines published in Turkey